Shawbury is a  village and civil parish in  the English county of Shropshire.

The village straddles the A53 between Shrewsbury and Market Drayton. The nearest railway station is at Yorton on the Welsh Marches Line for Shrewsbury/Crewe. The 2011 census recorded a population of 2,872 for the entire civil parish of Shawbury.

History
Shawbury has an entry in the Domesday Book of 1085. In the great book Shawbury is recorded by the name Sawesberie. The main landholders was Gerard from Earl Roger of Shrewsbury. The survey also mentions that there is a church and a mill.

Geography
The River Roden flows through the village.  The village of Moreton Corbet, with its castle, is just to the north.  
The main weather station for Shropshire is located in the village, at the RAF base. On 13 December 1981 a temperature of -25.2 °C was recorded, one of the coldest on record for England.

Governance
An electoral ward in the same name exists. This ward covers much of the surrounding area with a total ward population as taken at the 2011 Census of 4,666.

Landmarks
There has been a church on this site since at least the 12th century, although the present church is not from that date.
Many air force personnel from RAF Shawbury, an air station founded in 1917, are buried in the churchyard, which contains 32 Commonwealth War Graves, 3 from World War I and 29 from World War II, besides 7 Polish Air Force personnel from the latter war.

The village is home to RAF Shawbury, a helicopter airfield for the Royal Air Force of the United Kingdom and home of the tri-services Defence Helicopter Flying School.

Notable people
 Thomas Charles (1755-1814), later Calvinistic Methodist minister and founder of the British and Foreign Bible Society, worked in Shawbury in 1783-84 as assistant to then rector, friend John Mayor 
 William Hazledine (born Shawbury 1763–1840) an English ironmaster, he was a pioneer in casting structural ironwork, most notably for canal aqueducts and early suspension bridges
 Lieutenant-General Sir Richard Butler (1870-1935 in Shawbury) a British Army general during WW1, lived in retirement at Roden Lodge where he died.

Bus service
Shawbury is served by the 64 route, operated by Arriva Midlands North, which runs between Shrewsbury and Market Drayton.

Sport
Shawbury's football club is Shawbury United F.C.

See also 
 Listed buildings in Shawbury

Notes

References

External links 
 

Villages in Shropshire
Civil parishes in Shropshire